Keeya Khanna is a Mumbai born Indian actress. She appears in Hindi and Punjabi cinema. She is a theater trained actor. She is active in films from 2012.

Filmography

See also

List of Indian film actresses

References

External links 
 

Actresses from Mumbai
Indian film actresses
Actresses in Hindi cinema
Living people
Punjabi people
Year of birth missing (living people)